Sclerophrys reesi, also known as Merara toad or Rees' toad, is a species of toad in the family Bufonidae. It is named after Allen Rees, a principal game warden for the Tanzanian Wildlife Department who collected the type series.

Description
The holotype, an adult male, measures  in snout–urostyle length. Three adult female paratypes measure  in snout–urostyle length. The snout is acuminate. The tympanum is very distinct and almost circular. The parotoid glands are flattened and not very distinct. The toes are extensively webbed. Skin is granular. Alcohol-preserved specimens are light brown with darker inter-ocular, scapular, and sacral markings and golden brown warts and parotoid glands.

Habitat and conservation
The type series from was collected from a flood plain. Presumably the habitat of this species is floodplain grassland and the tadpoles are aquatic.

Threats to Sclerophrys reesi are poorly known, but agricultural encroachment, overgrazing by livestock, and expanding human settlements are potential threats. It is present in the poorly protected Kilombero Game Controlled Area.

References

reesi
Frogs of Africa
Amphibians of Tanzania
Endemic fauna of Tanzania
Amphibians described in 1977
Taxonomy articles created by Polbot